The Copper Harbor Light is a lighthouse located in the harbor of Copper Harbor, Michigan USA on the Keweenaw Peninsula of Upper Michigan inside Fort Wilkins Historic State Park. It is a Michigan State Historic Site and listed on the National Register of Historic Places.

History
The Copper Harbor Lighthouse was built on the tip of the eastern point of land that hugs the harbor.  The lighthouse aided in the transport of copper from the Upper Peninsula.  Ships carrying immigrants, supplies, and equipment increased dramatically.

Funding to build the light was approved in 1847.  The first tower was constructed in 1848 and resembled that at Old Presque Isle Lighthouse.  The Stone Masonry was dismantled, and the stones used as the foundation for the replacement lighthouse built in 1866.

The current lightkeeper's dwelling house is a survivor of the first light tower.  An improved lighthouse, which also survives, was raised in 1866 three years before the installation of the Copper Harbor Front Range Light and the Copper Harbor Rear Range Light.  The steel light tower in current use went into service in 1933.

The station was established in 1849.  A Fresnel lens was installed in 1856.  The current tower was first lit in 1866.  It is no longer operational.  It was automated in 1919, and deactivated in 1933.  The foundation materials are dressed stone and timer, and the building was made of brick.  The tower is square.  The color is "natural with black lantern."  A keeper's house is attached.

On February 22, 1974, the lighthouse was designated a Michigan State Historic Site. On June 7, 2012, it was listed on the National Register of Historic Places.

Present
The Copper Harbor Lighthouse is currently (as of 2006) operated as a unit of the Michigan Department of History, Arts, and Libraries.  It is open to the public in summer months and features a museum about the lighthouse and Lake Superior maritime history.
Other buildings on the location include a detached 1849 dwelling house, which functioned as a storage and oil house.

A lighthouse tour is available, complete with a ride on a wooden double-ender launch.  The boat leaves from the Municipal pier in Copper Harbor, typically taking 15 minutes to reach the point.

See also

 Lighthouses in the United States

References

External links

 Anderson, Kraig, Lighthouse Friends, Copper Harbor Light
 Aerial photos, Copper Harbor Light, marinas.com
 Copper Harbor Lighthouse Tours
 Copper Harbor Lighthouse, information from Michigan Historical Center, including a virtual tour

 Interactive map on Michigan lighthouses. Detroit News
 
 National Park Service Maritime History, Inventory of Historic Lights, Copper Harbor Light
 Photographs, Directions, Waypoints and History from Lighthouse Central
 Terry Pepper, Seeing the Light, Copper Harbor Light
 Wobser, David, Boatnerd.com Copper Harbor Light

Historic American Engineering Record in Michigan
Lighthouses completed in 1848
Houses completed in 1849
Lighthouses completed in 1866
Lighthouses completed in 1933
Lighthouses on the National Register of Historic Places in Michigan
Lighthouse museums in Michigan
Museums in Keweenaw County, Michigan
Michigan State Historic Sites in Keweenaw County
National Register of Historic Places in Keweenaw County, Michigan
1848 establishments in Michigan